Fermanagh and Tyrone  was a Parliamentary Constituency in Northern Ireland which was represented in the House of Commons of the Parliament of the United Kingdom.  It elected two Members of Parliament (MPs) using the bloc vote system.

Boundaries 
The constituency was formed from the constituencies of Fermanagh North, Fermanagh South, Tyrone North-East, Tyrone North-West and Tyrone South.  It covered County Fermanagh and County Tyrone in Northern Ireland, within which it was the only constituency to regularly elect Nationalist MPs.  It was abolished in 1950.  Much of the constituency then became Fermanagh and South Tyrone, the remainder part of Mid Ulster.

Members of Parliament 
Nationalist MPs were elected in every general election and by-election held in the constituency, except for the 1924 general election, when no Nationalist stood and two Ulster Unionists defeated two Sinn Féin candidates.

Elections

Sources 

F. W. S. Craig, British Parliamentary Election Results 1918 - 1949
ElectionsIreland.org

Westminster constituencies in County Fermanagh (historic)
Westminster constituencies in County Tyrone (historic)
Constituencies of the Parliament of the United Kingdom established in 1922
Constituencies of the Parliament of the United Kingdom disestablished in 1950